Dudley Field Malone (June 3, 1885 – October 5, 1955) was an American attorney, politician, liberal activist, and actor. Malone is best remembered as one of the most prominent liberal attorneys in the United States during the decade of the 1920s and for his unsuccessful 1920 campaign for Governor of New York.

Early life
Malone was born on the West Side of Manhattan on June 3, 1882. He was the son of William C. Malone of New York City, a Tammany Hall Democratic official, and Rose (née McKenny) Malone. He graduated from the College of St. Francis Xavier in 1903 and studied law at Fordham Law School, where he graduated in 1905.

After being admitted to the bar in 1907, he began practicing law and became active in the Democratic Party in New York, specifically in the reform faction opposed to the Tammany Hall organization. In 1912, he helped organize Woodrow Wilson's successful primary and general election campaign for US president.

Career

When Wilson took office in 1913, he rewarded Malone by appointing him Third Assistant Secretary of State. Later in 1913, Wilson appointed him Collector of the Port of New York, an important patronage position. As Collector, Malone resisted all efforts by Tammany to use the Collector's office for patronage. He served as Collector until 1917, when he resigned and was succeeded by Byron R. Newton, the former publicity director of Wilson's presidential campaign.

Malone broke decisively with the Wilson administration in the fall of 1917 and publicly endorsed the antiwar Socialist Morris Hillquit for Mayor of New York. He was not a member of the Socialist Party of America but found Hillquit's call for an expeditious end to the European war to be compelling and wrote in an open letter to Hillquit:

You, as I understand it, advocate no separate peace for America, but the quickest possible peace that can be negotiated in the interests of the masses of all nations, with no annexations and no punitive indemnities. If this be Socialism, it is also sound Catholicism, Protestantism, Judaism and Americanism.

Malone had become an advocate of women's suffrage and resigned to protest Wilson's failure to take up that issue or to support a Woman Suffrage Amendment to the Constitution. In 1918, he won the release of a group of suffragettes  jailed during the anti-Wilson Silent Sentinels demonstrations led by Alice Paul. Malone successfully appealed their convictions for "unlawful assembly" for "obstructing the sidewalk" in front of the White House.

In 1920, Malone ran for governor of New York as the candidate of the newly organized Farmer-Labor Party. In the 1920 election, he got only 69,908 votes out of over 2.8 million cast. In 1920, he began to devote himself to his law practice, specializing in international divorce cases of wealthy individuals and becoming known as "the greatest international divorce lawyer." He established a branch office in Paris, along with former Judge William H. Wadhams.

Later legal career
In 1925, Malone accepted an invitation to join Clarence Darrow as co-counsel for the defense of John T. Scopes in the famous "Monkey Trial." In response to Bryan's argument against admitting scientific testimony, Malone gave arguably the best speech of the trial in defense of academic freedom. "I have never learned anything from any man who agreed with me" was one of his famous quotes. In 1927, Malone identified as an Independent and wrote an op-ed in The New York Times denouncing Colonel Theodore Roosevelt Jr.'s "attacks on the Governor of this State and your abortive attempts to associate him with any responsibility for commercialized vice."

Malone continued his divorce practice until 1935, when he declared bankruptcy in New York and moved to Westwood, Los Angeles, California. He claimed his debts consisted mostly of sums owed to personal friends, including William K. Vanderbilt, Edward F. Hutton and the late Otto H. Kahn. He served as counsel to 20th Century Fox and appeared in a few movies as a character actor. As Malone bore a strong resemblance to Winston Churchill, he was called on to play Churchill in the film adaptation of Joseph E. Davies's book Mission to Moscow (1943).

Personal life
On November 14, 1908, he married May Patricia O'Gorman (1884–1961), the daughter of Judge and US Senator James Aloysius O'Gorman, at the Church of the Ascension, on West 107th Street, New York City. May served overseas with the Red Cross during World War I and later worked with Anne Morgan to restore devastated regions in France. After living apart for several years, she obtained a divorce from him in Paris in 1921.

A few months after his divorce, he married the writer and suffragette activist Doris Stevens (1888–1963) on December 9, 1921 in Peekskill, New York. She was the first female member of the American Institute of International Law and first chair of the Inter-American Commission of Women. They also divorced in Paris in October 1929, on the ground of abandonment. "Her plea was based on the alleged impossibility of two persons of equally strong mind living harmoniously together."

On January 29, 1930 in London, he married Edna Louise Johnson, an actress whom he had met through the novelist William John Locke. The witnesses at their wedding were Sir William Jowitt, the Attorney General of England, and Lady Cynthia Mosley, a Member of Parliament for Stoke-on-Trent. Before his death in 1950, they were the parents of one son:

 Dudley Field "Shim" Malone Jr. (1931–1990), a theatrical agent and manager.

In July 1949, three brothers attacked him in a "roadside fight," and he suffered a head gash. Malone died on October 5, 1950 in Culver City, California.

References

External links

 
 Tribute to Lajpat Rai by Dudley Field Malone in the South Asian American Digital Archive (SAADA)

1880s births
1950 deaths
American male film actors
New York (state) lawyers
New York (state) Democrats
American civil rights lawyers
New York (state) Farmer–Laborites
Collectors of the Port of New York
Fordham University School of Law alumni
Male actors from New York City
Xavier High School (New York City) alumni
20th-century American male actors
20th-century American lawyers
20th-century American politicians